The Sinan Pasha Mosque is a mosque in the Bulaq district in Cairo. It was established by the governor of Cairo Koca Sinan Pasha around 1571.

When the mosque was built the site was on the Nile shore which has since shifted westward. The mosque's architecture combines Mamluk and Ottoman features. The last include its free-standing position in a garden and the gallery surrounding its square prayer hall on three sides roofed with eleven shallow domes. The mosque has a pencil-shaped minaret at its southern corner. The prayer hall's three entrance portals are decorated with Muqarnas.

The interior is influenced by the Fadawiya Mausoleum. There is a wooden dikka on the northeastern side.

The mosque was once part of a complex with three khans. Its hamam still exists.

Notes

References

 
 
 

Ottoman mosques in Egypt
Mosques in Cairo